Teimuraz Sharashenidze (born 21 January 1992) is a Georgian football player who currently plays for FC Merani Martvili.

References 
Profile at HLSZ

1992 births
Living people
Footballers from Tbilisi
Association football forwards
Footballers from Georgia (country)
Georgia (country) under-21 international footballers
Győri ETO FC players
FC Spartaki Tskhinvali players
FC Chikhura Sachkhere players
FC Guria Lanchkhuti players
FC Kolkheti-1913 Poti players
FC Mertskhali Ozurgeti players
FC Merani Martvili players
Erovnuli Liga players
Nemzeti Bajnokság I players
Expatriate footballers from Georgia (country)
Expatriate footballers in Hungary
Expatriate sportspeople from Georgia (country) in Hungary